Robert Frazer may refer to:

 Robert Frazer (1891–1944), American actor who appeared in over 200 films from the 1910s to the 1940s; played the title role in the 1912 film Robin Hood
 Robert Frazer (Lewis and Clark), private on the Lewis and Clark Expedition that kept an unpublished journal
 Robert Frazer (diplomat), United States Envoy to El Salvador (1937–1942)
 Robert Frazer (engineer), British engineer that assisted in building the Grand Crimean Central Railway
 Bob Frazer (born 1971), Canadian actor
 Robert S. Frazer (1849–1936), Chief Justice of the Supreme Court of Pennsylvania (1930–1936)
 Robert Caine Frazer, one of the pen names of English writer John Creasey (1908–1973)

See also
Robert Frazier (disambiguation)
 Robert Fraser (disambiguation)